Muthaiahpuram is a panchayat town in Thoothukudi district in the Indian state of Tamil Nadu.

Demographics
 India census, Muttayyapuram had a population of 30,314. Males constitute 52% of the population and females 48%. Muttayyapuram has an average literacy rate of 70%, higher than the national average of 59.5%: male literacy is 74%, and female literacy is 66%. In Muttayyapuram, 11% of the population is under 6 years of age.

References

Cities and towns in Thoothukudi district